The Canal Warehouse is a historic warehouse at the intersection of Main and Mulberry Streets in downtown Chillicothe, Ohio, United States.  Built in 1830, along the Ohio and Erie Canal, this three-story brick building is an ornate gabled structure with large dormers set into both sides of the main roof.  These dormers served a purpose far different from decoration: their windows connect with first-floor doors to enable longshoremen easily to move goods into or out of the third floor.  On the ground level, individuals can enter the warehouse through either of two recessed doorways; three stone steps climb from the sidewalk to each doorway.

After it ceased to operate as a canalside warehouse, the building was converted into a clubhouse for the local post of the Veterans of Foreign Wars.  Today, the warehouse has been recognized as a leading example of canal-related architecture; few warehouses built for the Ohio and Erie Canal survive in comparable condition.  In recognition of its place in local transportation history, the Canal Warehouse was listed on the National Register of Historic Places in 1974.  Additionally, it lies within the boundaries of the Chillicothe Business District, a historic district that was added to the National Register in 1979.

References

1830 establishments in Ohio
Buildings and structures in Chillicothe, Ohio
Commercial buildings completed in 1830
Commercial buildings on the National Register of Historic Places in Ohio
Clubhouses in Ohio
Individually listed contributing properties to historic districts on the National Register in Ohio
National Register of Historic Places in Ross County, Ohio
U.S. Route 50
Veterans of Foreign Wars buildings
Warehouses on the National Register of Historic Places
Water transportation buildings and structures on the National Register of Historic Places